The Tanzania Civil Aviation Authority (TCAA) is the government body that regulates air services and airport services, and provides air navigation services, in Tanzania. It was founded by an Act of Parliament in 2003 and operates under the purview of the Ministry of Infrastructure Development.  The TCAA is responsible for the disposition of aviation safety and for the licensing of aviation personnel.  It is also responsible for contributing to the financial oversight of Tanzania's air infrastructure development; the registration of aircraft; for the investigation of air accidents; for local area search and rescue; and in conjunction with the Tanzania Airports Authority, for the operation of airports and aerodromes.

The head office of the TCAA is located in the Aviation House building in the Banana Ukonga Area of Dar es Salaam. Previously the head office was located jointly on the second floor of the IPS Building and the fourth floor of the TETEX Building in Dar es Salaam.

History

2016 
The Ministry of Works, Communication and Transport appoints Mr. Hamza Johari as the new Director general of the Authority, replacing Mr Redemptus Bugomola, who was the acting director general.

See also

Civil aviation authority
Tanzania Airports Authority
Transport in Tanzania

References

External links
 Official website

Civil
Tanzania
Aviation organisations based in Tanzania
Government agencies established in 2003
Air navigation service providers
2003 establishments in Tanzania
Organizations investigating aviation accidents and incidents
Civil aviation in Tanzania